Astis (Astís in Occitan) is a commune in the Pyrénées-Atlantiques department in the Nouvelle-Aquitaine region of south-western France.

The inhabitants of the commune are known as Astisiens or Astisiennes.

Geography

Astis is located some 20 km north of Pau and some 4 km south of Miossens-Lanusse. Access to the commune is by road D834 (Route de Bordeaux) from Pau entering the commune from the south-west passing through the village and continuing north to Sarron. The D39 road (Route de Morlaas) branches off the D834 in the north of the commune and goes south-east to Anos. The commune has a strip of forest along the length of the commune from north-west to south-east, parallel to the Route de Morlaas with the rest of the commune farmland.

The Luy de France forms the eastern border of the commune as it flows north eventually joining the Luy de Béarn and becoming the Luy river on the eastern border of Castel-Sarrazin commune. The Basta river rises in the south of the commune and flows north-west joining the Luy de France north of the commune.

Places and hamlets

 Anos
 Baradat
 Bernadot
 La Caserne
 Château
 Chinchin
 Dibet
 Guichanné
 Jacoulet
 Lamazou
 Nabarrot
 Pascal
 Plantié
 Sarrette
 Sarthoulet
 Sébat
 Tauhuré

Neighbouring communes and villages

Toponymy
The commune name in béarnais is also Astis. Michel Grosclaude proposed a Gascon etymology es (an old definitive article) followed by t(h)in ("Dependence") or tin ("singer").

The following table details the origins of the commune name:

Sources
Raymond: Topographic Dictionary of the Department of Basses-Pyrenees, 1863, on the page numbers indicated in the table. 
Grosclaude: Toponymic Dictionary of communes, Béarn, 2006 
Census: Census of Béarn
Cassini Map: Cassini Map from 1750

Administration

List of Successive Mayors

Inter-communality

The commune is part of four inter-communal structures:
 the Communauté de communes des Luys en Béarn;
 the AEP association of the regions of Luy and Gabas;
 the Energy association of Pyrénées-Atlantiques;
 the scholastic association Argelos-Astis;

Demography
In 2017 the commune had 306 inhabitants.

Culture and heritage

Civil heritage
The commune has a number of buildings and structures that are registered as historical monuments:

A Chateau (19th century)
The Maison Mouras Farmhouse (1771)
A Farmhouse at Lamazou (1646)
The Maison Larrieu Farmhouse (17th century)
The Maison Lassus Farmhouse (1894)
Houses and Farms (17th-19th centuries)
A Fortified Complex (Prehistoric)

Religious heritage

The Church of Saint John the Baptist (12th century) is registered as a historical monument.

The Church contains many items that are registered as historical objects:
A Bronze Bell (1591)
Furniture in the Church
A Bronze Bell in the bell tower (1591)
A Ciborium (19th century)
2 Altar Candlesticks (19th century)
2 Altar Candlesticks (19th century)
2 Altar Candlesticks (torch bodies) (19th century)
A Painting: Saint John in the desert (18th century)
A Worship bench (19th century)
Baptismal fonts (19th century)
2 Statues: Saint Peter & Saint John (18th century)
Bas-relief: Christ on the cross between Saint Madeleine & Saint John (18th century)
A Retable (18th century)
Altar seating and Tabernacle (18th century)
Main Altar Seating, Tabernacle, and Retable

Facilities

Astis has a primary school which is shared with Argelos as an inter-communal educational grouping.

See also
Communes of the Pyrénées-Atlantiques department

External links
Community of communes of Luys en Béarn 
Astis on Géoportail, National Geographic Institute (IGN) website 
Astis on the 1750 Cassini Map

References

Communes of Pyrénées-Atlantiques